Gerokgak is a district (kecamatan) in the Buleleng Regency in northern Bali, Indonesia which includes Desa Pemuteran, Sumberkima and Pejarakan, Buleleng Barat (West Buleleng).

Pemuteran Bay Conservation
Pemuteran's coral restoration in Pemuteran Bay has been running since 2000 which has planted about 70 'bio-rocks'. Many awards have been received by the project:
 2002, Konas Award from the Maritime Affairs and Fisheries Ministry for the Best Community Based Coastal Management
 2005, The Asianta Award and Kalpataru Award from the President of Indonesia
 2007, The Pioneering Award from the Bali Administration
 2008, The Pacific Asia Travel Association (PATA) Gold Award
 2011, Tri Hita Karana Award
 2012, The Equator Prize Award by the United Nations Development Programme (UNDP) and UNDP Special Award for Marine and Coastal Zone Management
dive the BIOROCK in Pemuteran

References

Districts of Bali
Buleleng Regency